My Foolish Heart is a solo album by American guitarist Ralph Towner recorded in 2016 and released on the ECM label.

Production 
Towner had long wanted to record the jazz standard, "My Foolish Heart", stating in an interview with National Public Radio "It's one of the first tunes I'd heard that combination of Bill Evans, Scott LaFaro and Paul Motian play. So that tune had a lot of meaning for me and was very important for me starting out as a jazz musician."  The composition "Blues As In Bley" is dedicated to the jazz pianist Paul Bley who died a month before the recordings. The album also includes two compositions from early Oregon albums: “Shard”, from Music of Another Present Era (1972) and “Rewind”, from Beyond Words (1995).

Reception 
The Allmusic review by Matt Collar awarded the album 4 stars, stating, "Ultimately, it's Towner's immense gift for portraying that kind of romantic drama that makes My Foolish Heart such an evocative listening experience." Will Layman from PopMatters wrote positively that "Listeners with a hunger for subtlety will find a feast here, played on classical guitar but in several styles and modes." and "Towner is a tiny orchestra unto himself."

Track listing
All compositions by Ralph Towner except as indicated
 "Pilgrim" - 4:32
 "I'll Sing To You" - 4:33
 "Saunter" - 5:01
 "My Foolish Heart" (Victor Young) - 4:14
 "Dolomiti Dance" - 4:24
 "Clarion Call" - 4:40
 "Two Poets" - 2:05
 "Shard" - 0:54
 "Ubi Sunt" - 1:21
 "Biding Time" - 1:29
 "Blues As In Bley" - 3:54
 "Rewind" - 3:44

Recorded at Auditorio Stelio Molo RSI in Lugano, Switzerland in February 2016

Personnel 
 Ralph Towner — classical guitar, 12 string guitar

References 

2017 albums
Albums produced by Manfred Eicher
ECM Records albums
Ralph Towner albums
Instrumental albums